is a passenger railway station located in the city of Susaki, Kōchi Prefecture, Japan. It is operated by JR Shikoku and has the station number "K19".

Lines

In addition to the local trains of the Dosan Line, the following limited express services also stop at Susaki Station:

Layout
The station consists of a side platform and an island platform serving three tracks. There are also several passing loops and sidings on either side of the station. A station building houses a waiting room, a JR ticket window (with Midori no Madoguchi facility) as well as a JR Travel Centre (Warp Plaza). Access to the island platform is by means of a footbridge. Car parking and car rental facilities are available at the station.

Adjacent stations

History
The station opened on 30 March 1924 when the then Kōchi Line (later renamed the Dosan Line) was constructed from here eastwards towards . At the time of it opening, Susaki was operated Japanese Government Railways, later becoming Japanese National Railways (JNR). With the privatization of JNR on 1 April 1987, control of the station passed to JR Shikoku. A plate on the station building declares that Susaki is "Point Zero" on the Dosan Line, though this is incorrect.

Surrounding area
Susaki City Civic Cultural Center
Susaki Municipal Susaki Elementary School
Kochi District Court Susaki Branch

See also
 List of Railway Stations in Japan

References

External links

Susaki Station (JR Shikoku)

Railway stations in Kōchi Prefecture
Railway stations in Japan opened in 1924
Susaki, Kōchi